The Basketball Champions League Americas (BCLA) (Spanish: Baloncesto Liga Campeones de las Américas, Portuguese: Liga dos Campeões de Basquetebol das Américas) is Pan-America's premier men's basketball club competition. Founded in 2019, it replaced the FIBA Americas League as the highest tier league in the continent. The winner of each year's competition qualifies to the annual FIBA Intercontinental Cup.

History 
On 24 September 2019, FIBA launched the panamerican competition, which derives its name and branding from the European Basketball Champions League. The competition replaced the FIBA Americas League as premier league in the Americas, President Horacio Muratore stated: "This is not a succession of Liga de las Américas, but rather a new product of our development project that will foster a balance between representation and quality". The competition consisted of twelve teams, which had to qualify through their domestic leagues. The inaugural season started on October 28, 2019. On October 30, 2021, Quimsa won the inaugural championship after winning the final in Montevideo. Canadian clubs Edmonton Stingers and Brampton Honey Badgers are the only North American teams to participate in the competition so far.

Format
As for the competition's format, the first phase of the BCLA will feature four groups of three teams each, with two qualifying teams per group that move on to the Quarter-Finals, which will be a best-of-three series. The Semi-Finals and the Final will also be decided in a best-of-three format.

Results

List of seasons

Performance by club

Performance by country

Performance by head coach 
Only one head coach has appeared in multiple finals, as Gustavo de Conti of Flamengo coached in two.

All-time participants
The following is a list of clubs who have played in the Basketball Champions League Americas at any time since its formation in 2019 to the current season.

References

External links
Official website
BCL Americas on Twitter

 
International club basketball competitions
1
Multi-national professional sports leagues